Sheo Sharan Verma (9 January 1925 – 27 January 2010) was an Indian politician. He was elected to the Lok Sabha the lower house of Indian Parliament from Machhlishahr in Uttar Pradesh in 1980,1989 and 1991 as a member of the Janata Dal.

Verma died in Allahabad on 27 January 2010, at the age of 85.

References

External links
 Official Biographical Sketch in Lok Sabha Website

1925 births
2010 deaths
India MPs 1980–1984
India MPs 1989–1991
India MPs 1991–1996
Lok Sabha members from Uttar Pradesh
Janata Dal politicians
People from Pratapgarh district, Rajasthan
People from Jaunpur district
Lok Dal politicians
Janata Party (Secular) politicians
Janata Party politicians